Chhuikhadan State, also known as Kondka, was a princely state of British India, which later formed part of Chhattisgarh States Agency. The state flag was a purple triangle with a coat of arms.

There were 120 villages in 1870 with a population of 13,281. By 1941, the population had increased to 32,731. The capital of the state was Chhuikhadan.

History

The Chiefs of Chhuikhadan were originally under the Bhonsles of Nagpur, the first Chief being Mahant Rup Das in 1750. However, after the defeat of Marathas, they were recognized by the British as feudatory chiefs in 1865 conferring the title and sanad to Mahant Laxman Das. Shrimant Mahant Rituparna Kishore Das, the last ruling chief of Chhuikhadan acceded to the Union of India on 1 February 1948.

At India's independence on 1 January 1948, the state was merged into India. The former royal palace is still in very good condition.

Rulers

See also
Chhuikhadan

References

Princely states of India
1750 establishments in India
1948 disestablishments in India
History of Chhattisgarh
Rajnandgaon district
States and territories established in 1750
States and territories disestablished in 1948
Central Provinces